Supercell (stylized as supercell) is an 11-member Japanese pop band led by musician and songwriter Ryo, which formed in 2007 as a dōjin music band. The other 10 members are artists and designers who provide illustrations in album booklets and music videos. Supercell started out by making use of the Hatsune Miku Vocaloid singing synthesizer to produce vocals for songs submitted to the Nico Nico Douga video sharing website. The popularity of the songs led the band to release their independent self-titled album Supercell (2008). Supercell later signed to Sony Music Entertainment Japan and had a professional release of their Supercell album in March 2009, which was updated with more songs.

Supercell made a transition to vocalist Nagi Yanagi with their debut single "Kimi no Shiranai Monogatari" (2009). Two more singles featuring Yanagi were released in 2010, followed by Supercell's second album Today Is A Beautiful Day (2011), which was Yanagi's last contribution with Supercell. Following Yanagi's departure, Supercell held auditions for vocalists, and 15-year-old female singer Koeda was chosen out of about 2,000 candidates. Koeda's first single with Supercell is "My Dearest" (2011), and four more singles featuring Koeda were released between 2012 and 2013, followed by Supercell's third album Zigaexperientia (2013), which was Koeda's last contribution with Supercell. In 2019, Supercell chose the singers Ann and Gaku to be their new vocalists.

Supercell and Today Is A Beautiful Day were awarded a Gold Disc by the Recording Industry Association of Japan for having exceeded 100,000 copies shipped in a single year, and Supercell was chosen as one of the best five new Japanese artists of 2009 during the 2010 Japan Gold Disc Award competition.

History

2007–2008: Formation and indie releases
On December 7, 2007, Ryo submitted the song  to the Nico Nico Douga video sharing website, and since then the video has been viewed over 14 million times. For the song's vocals, Ryo used the Vocaloid singing synthesizer software Hatsune Miku, and he used an illustration of Miku by an artist named 119 (pronounced Hikeshi) on the video without his permission. After Ryo contacted 119 with an apology, 119 responded with great interest in "Melt" and began to work together with Ryo, thus forming Supercell. More members joined Supercell since its formation, which led to 11 members by the time the group made its major debut. In an article in The Japan Times, Ryo admitted that he did not have any "big intentions" in uploading "Melt" to Nico Nico Douga and was not someone who "set out to find success" as he put it.

Ryo chose to distribute his music on Nico Nico Douga because he liked the website along with its response system, which enables user's comments to appear overlaid on the video screen. Ryo did not originally intend to use Hatsune Miku as the vocalist for his songs, and most members of Supercell did not even know of Miku until after "Melt" gained popularity.  Since Ryo did not know any singers, he was recommended by his friends to use Miku, which he thought was a good idea since videos using Miku were already widely being distributed on Nico Nico Douga at the time.

In 2008, Supercell continued to release songs on Nico Nico Douga which quickly became popular. Ryo composed the song , released as a limited edition image song CD with the fifth volume of Shū Shirase's light novel series Oto × Maho on July 15, 2008. The song was released in two versions: one sung by Hatsune Miku sold at Animate and one sung by the human singer Sari sold at Comic Toranoana. At Comiket 74 in August 2008, Supercell released the independent self-titled album Supercell containing their most popular songs in addition to several previously unreleased tracks. On December 12, 2008, Supercell released  on Nico Nico Douga, which has since received over 3 million views.

2009–2011: Major debut and vocalist Nagi Yanagi
Supercell made their major debut with Sony Music Entertainment Japan with the professional release of their Supercell album on March 4, 2009. The updated release included the art book originally bundled with the indie version, contained more songs than the original, and included a DVD with music videos for four songs. The album obtained a No. 4 ranking on Oricon's weekly albums chart, and in June 2009 was awarded the Gold Disc by the Recording Industry Association of Japan for having exceeded 100,000 copies shipped in a single year. Ryo approached singer Nagi Yanagi to be the vocalist for Supercell's debut single , who was known for her uploads to Nico Nico Douga under the name Gazelle. The single was released on August 12, 2009 and ranked No. 5 on Oricon's weekly singles chart. The song "Kimi no Shiranai Monogatari" was used as the ending theme song for the 2009 Bakemonogatari anime series, and the single also included two tracks featured in the 2009 animated film Cencoroll. Supercell was chosen as one of the best five new Japanese artists of 2009 during the 2010 Japan Gold Disc Award competition.

A second single, was released on February 10, 2010. Supercell's third single, is a double A-side and was released on August 25, 2010. "Utakata Hanabi" was used as the 14th ending theme for the Naruto: Shippuden anime series and "Hoshi ga Matataku Konna Yoru ni" was used as the ending theme for Type-Moon's visual novel Mahōtsukai no Yoru. Supercell released a split single in collaboration with Kz of Livetune called  on July 14, 2010 by Sony Music Direct, which is the theme song of Hatsune Miku: Project DIVA 2nd. Ryo composed "Kotchi Muite Baby" and Livetune composed "Yellow"; both songs are sung by Hatsune Miku. Supercell produced the song  as a theme song to Shueisha's manga magazine Aoharu, a special edition version of Young Jump, which had its first issue on November 30, 2010.

A 50-minute original video animation project titled Black Rock Shooter was released on July 24, 2010 based on the song "Black Rock Shooter" and its original music video featuring illustrations by Huke. A "Pilot Edition" of the anime was released on DVD and Blu-ray Disc on September 30, 2009. Ryo and Huke collaborated on the project with supervisor Yutaka Yamamoto and his animation studio Ordet; Shinobu Yoshioka directed the project. Black Rock Shooter is Ordet's first solo production as the main animation studio. Some footage of the anime was shown at Anime Expo on July 4, 2010.

In late 2010, Shibuya, Tokyo-based company INCS toenter established the major record label TamStar Records for musicians and artists who originally made their debut as dōjin music artists online. Supercell joined the label as one of the inaugural members, including others such as Livetune, Gom, Rapbit, and Nagi Yanagi. Supercell collaborated on a compilation album titled TamStar Records Collection Vol. 0 released as a limited edition at Comiket 79 in December 2010; on the album is Ryo's "Kibō no Neiro" sung by Hatsune Miku and  sung by Rapbit and Clear. TamStar Records released a remix album of Supercell's debut album Supercell as a tribute to the band titled Stowaways on January 17, 2011. Supercell released their second studio album Today Is A Beautiful Day on March 16, 2011, which was Yanagi's last contribution with Supercell.

2011–2013: Vocalist Koeda
Supercell held auditions from May 25 to June 19, 2011 for a guest vocalist on the band's third album. The main criteria for the vocalist was his or her voice, as Supercell was not concerned with the singer's gender or age. Out of about 2,000 candidates, then 15-year-old female singer Koeda was chosen. Also, then 17-year-old female singer Chelly was selected to be the vocalist for Ryo's separate music act Egoist. Supercell collaborated with the dōjin musician Dixie Flatline to produce the split single " / Fallin' Fallin' Fallin'" released on August 31, 2011 by Sony Music Direct. Ryo composed "Sekiranun Graffiti" and Dixie Flatline composed "Fallin' Fallin' Fallin'"; both songs are sung by Hatsune Miku. "Sekiranun Graffiti" is used as the opening theme to Hatsune Miku: Project DIVA Extend. The theme songs for the 2011 anime series Guilty Crown were produced by Ryo. The band's fourth single "My Dearest" and was released on November 23, 2011; the song was used as the anime's first opening theme.

Supercell's fifth single, also released on March 7, 2012, is the double A-side . "Kokuhaku" was used as Guilty Crowns second ending theme, and "Bokura no Ashiato" was used as the ending theme to the 2012 anime series Black Rock Shooter. Ryo wrote the song "Light My Fire" sung by Kotoko, which was used as the first opening theme to the 2011 anime series Shakugan no Shana Final. Ryo also wrote the song "Naisho no Hanashi" sung by ClariS, which was used as the ending theme to the 2012 anime series Nisemonogatari. Ryo collaborated with the dōjin musician Jin to produce the split single "Odds & Ends / Sky of Beginning" released on August 29, 2012 by Sony Music Direct. Ryo composed "Odds & Ends" and Jin composed "Sky of Beginning"; both songs are sung by Hatsune Miku. "Odds & Ends" is the opening theme song to Hatsune Miku: Project DIVA F.

In 2012, designer Yoshika Usa collaborated with illustrator Tomoko Fujinoko to create the manga Wooser's Hand-to-Mouth Life, which was adapted into a CG anime series by Sanzigen in 2012. The anime's ending theme song  by Tia is written by Ryo, who has continued to produce music for the singer. Supercell's sixth single  was released on December 19, 2012; the song is used as the opening theme to the 2012 anime film Nerawareta Gakuen. Supercell's seventh single "The Bravery" was released on March 13, 2013; the song is used as the second ending theme to the 2012 anime series Magi: The Labyrinth of Magic. Supercell's eighth single  was released on June 12, 2013; the song is used as the opening theme for the 2013 rebroadcast of the 2010 anime series Katanagatari. Supercell released their third studio album Zigaexperientia on November 27, 2013, which was Koeda's last contribution with Supercell.

2015–present: Vocalists Ann and Gaku
Ryo composed the music for the 2015 video game Bravely Second: End Layer. Ryo produced the single "Great Distance" featuring Chelly released on May 20, 2015; this song is used as the opening theme song to Bravely Second. Also included on the single is "Last Song", which is used as the ending theme to Bravely Second. Ryo released the digital single  featuring Hatsune Miku on June 8, 2016. Supercell took applications for a new vocalist from July 11 to August 31, 2016. Supercell announced they had chosen Ann and Gaku as their new vocalists on July 29, 2019, and they also released a music video of their new single "#Love" featuring both vocalists. Supercell's ninth single "#Love feat. Ann, Gaku" was released on September 11, 2019; the song was used as the theme song for the 2019 film Cencoroll Connect.

Musical style and influences
Daniel Robson of The Japan Times described Supercell's music as "sentimental J-pop...[that] also explores the genre's jazzier, spunkier and dancier elements." Their sound has been compared to pop singers Aiko and Yui, and Ryo has stated himself that he likes expressing human emotions in his music. When creating a song, Ryo has often hummed a tune into a digital recorder, or starts by playing the piano. While it depends on the song, Ryo has stated he generally "play[s] the piano and take[s] notes of the chord progression" and then writes the lyrics. Ryo has cited "artists that blend rock and hip-hop styles with today's latest technology" as influencing his music, including: Massive Attack, Boom Boom Satellites, Portishead, Tricky, and Unkle.

Ryo found it difficult at first to write "tenderhearted" lyrics for songs meant to be sung by young women. When describing the lyrics for his songs using Hatsune Miku as the vocalist, Ryo felt that writing without hesitation based on his initial ideas with minimal editing was best, because the singer, as a computer program, would not feel embarrassed about singing the lyrics. He admitted that his friends would laugh when he played the songs, but he thought that "if a 16-year-old girl is supposed to be singing...it is best if she sings about romance." When writing lyrics for human singers, Ryo takes more care in writing lyrics that singers would not be embarrassed to sing. When Ryo receives an offer to compose theme music, he writes lyrics that tie in with the theme and mood of the given work, such as the ending themes "Kimi no Shiranai Monogatari" for the anime Bakemonogatari, and "Hoshi ga Matataku Konna Yoru ni" for the visual novel Mahōtsukai no Yoru.

Members
Supercell is made up of 11 members led by Ryo, who produces the music and writes the lyrics. The other 10 members provide illustrations, animation, design, and photography in album booklets, cases and music videos.
Ryo (music, lyrics)
Shirow Miwa (illustration)
Huke (illustration)
Redjuice (illustration)
Suga (illustration)
Maque (illustration and animation)
Yoshiki Usa at Wooserdesign (design)
Hei8ro (Heihachiro) (support in illustration and photography)
Guitar (support in illustration)
Crow (support)
Golv (support)

Former members
119 (Hikeshi) (illustration)

Guest vocalists
Nagi Yanagi (2009–2011)
Koeda (2011–2013)
Ann (2019–present)
Gaku (2019–present)

Discography

Studio albums

Singles

Other singles

Other charted songs

Music videos

Other album appearances

Other video album appearances

Notes

References

Further reading

External links
Supercell's official website 

Anime composers
Doujin music
Japanese pop music groups
Musical groups established in 2007
Sony Music Entertainment Japan artists
Vocaloid musicians